Wollaston wire is a very fine (less than 0.01 mm thick) platinum wire clad in silver and used in electrical instruments.  For most uses, the silver cladding is etched away by acid to expose the platinum core.

History 
The wire is named after its inventor, William Hyde Wollaston, who first produced it in England in the early 19th century. Removal of the silver coating with an acid bath leaves the fine platinum wire as a product of the process.

Uses 
Wollaston wire was used in early radio detectors known as electrolytic detectors  and the hot wire barretter.   Other uses include suspension of delicate devices, sensing of temperature, and sensitive electrical power measurements.

It continues to be used for the fastest-responding hot-wire anemometers.

References 

History of radio
Radio electronics
Wire